Dolga Vas is a settlement immediately north of Lendava in the Prekmurje region of Slovenia. It lies on the border with Hungary.

Notable people
Notable people that were born or lived in Dolga Vas include:
Mária Pozsonec, politician

References

External links
Dolga Vas on Geopedia

Populated places in the Municipality of Lendava